Juan Friede Alter (Wlava, Russian Empire, 17 February 1901 - Bogotá, Colombia, 28 June 1990) was a Ukrainian-Colombian historian of Jewish descent who is recognised as one of the most important writers about Colombian history, the Spanish conquests and a proponent of indigenism; the defense of the rights and descriptions of the oppression of indigenous people.

Juan Friede went to Colombia in 1926 for business and his fascination for the country, its climate and culture made him emigrate. He became a Colombian citizen in 1930. During the 1940s, Friede made extensive studies about various indigenous peoples in the country. He was a professor at the newly founded Department of Social Sciences of the National University of Colombia and is considered one of the pioneers of the "New History" movement in Colombia, together with Jaime Jaramillo Uribe, Luis Eduardo Nieto Arteta and Luis Ospina Vásquez. His former house in San Agustín since 2006 bears the name Casa Museo Juan Friede.

Biography 

Juan Friede Alter was born in a village called Wlava, indicated as Ukrainian or Polish, close to the border with Germany, part of the Russian Empire on February 17, 1901 in a Jewish family. Friede went to school in Moscow in the turbulent years of the Russian Revolution of 1917. The new regime drove the family to Germany and Friede studied Economical and Social Sciences at the Hochschule für Welthandel in Vienna, graduating in 1922. The environment of Vienna of the 1920s influenced Friede positively and he was a member of an anarcho-ecological society called Vanderfliegel. After his studies in Vienna, he continued his research at the newly founded London School of Economics. In 1923, Friede started working for the import-export firm J. Stern & Co. The firm sent Friede to Colombia in 1926.

Friede arrived first in Cartagena and later in Buenaventura. He was so much impressed by the country, its climate, poverty and people, that he decided to emigrate. Juan Friede first settled in Manizales, working for J. Stern & Co in trading coffee, automobiles and other imports, a job offering him to travel through Colombia. On February 20, or March 3, 1930, Friede became a Colombian national. After a decline in the activities of J. Stern & Co., Friede worked for Caldas Motors, a subsidiary of Ford Motors from 1935 to 1941. In 1939, Friede moved from Manizales to Bogotá and in 1940 he opened the first art gallery in the Colombian capital. Two years later  Colombian muralist Pedro Nel Gómez held an exposition in Friede's art gallery.

During the Holy Week of 1942, Friede made the first documentary about the important archaeological and UNESCO World Heritage Site San Agustín. This formed the onset of further studies of the indigenous people of Colombia between 1943 and 1946. He lived in San Agustín until the end of 1945. In 1944, Friede published his book El indio en la lucha por la tierra, where he described the continuous repression of the indigenous people of the department of Cauca.

Friede is considered together with Jaime Jaramillo Uribe, Luis Eduardo Nieto Arteta and Luis Ospina Vásquez, one of the founders of "New History" in Colombia, after writing a voluminous work about the conquests and indigenous history in his 1955 publication Documentos Inéditos para la Historia de Colombia.

In 1959 the Department of Social Sciences of the National University of Colombia was founded, where Juan Friede was one of the main professors. Between 1962 and 1990, Friede lived in Colombia and the United States.

Juan Friede has published 682 works in Spanish and English. He spoke fluent Russian, German, French, English and Spanish.

Research by Juan Friede

Indigenous peoples of Colombia 

Friede has published various books and articles about the indigenous peoples of Colombia, among others the Muisca, Andaquí, Arhuaco, Kofán and Quimbaya.

Conquest 

Many conquistadors as well as Spanish chroniclers in Colombia have been described in biographies by Juan Friede. On Pedro de Aguado, whose birth date is uncertain, he wrote that De Aguado was baptised in Valdemoro on January 26, 1513. Friede published about Rodrigo de Bastidas and others in La conquista del territorio y el poblamiento. The abuse of the indigenous people by Pedro de Heredia was reported by Friede in Fuentes documentales para la historia del Nuevo Reino de Granada: desde la instalación de la Real Audiencia en Santafé.

Juan Friede has published various works about the Spanish conquest of the Muisca and the foundation of Bogotá. He described the routes of the main conquistadors Gonzalo Jiménez de Quesada and Nikolaus Federmann towards the Bogotá savanna and Eastern Hills in Descubrimiento del Nuevo Reino de Granada y Fundación de Bogotá (1536–1539). In 1960, Friede published a review of Epítome de la conquista del Nuevo Reino de Granada, an early publication about the conquest expeditions of the Spanish against the Muisca and Panche of uncertain authorship. Friede maintains the work has been written entirely by Gonzalo Jiménez de Quesada, the main conquistador of central-Colombia.

History 

Friede also published about the post-Spanish history of Colombia and Peru; the Battle of Boyacá in 1819, the Battle of Ayacucho in 1824, the foundation of the Mint in Bogotá in the seventeenth century, the history of Pereira and Popayán, especially Juan del Valle, and the Colombian painters Carlos Correa and Luis Alberto Acuña. Juan Friede Alter wrote a critical review of friar Pedro Simón, and together with Benjamin Keen he published a major biography of friar Bartolomé de las Casas in 1971.

Works 
This list is a selection.

Books

Indigenous people 
 1979 - Indígenas y represión en Colombia
 1974 - Los chibchas bajo la dominación española
 1973 - La explotación indígena en Colombia bajo el gobierno de las misiones el caso de los aruacos de la Sierra Nevada de Santa Marta
 1963 - Los quimbayas bajo la dominación española : estudio documental 1539-1810
 1963 - Problemas sociales de los aruacos: tierras, gobierno, misiones
 1953 - Los andakí, 1538-1947: historia de la aculturación de una tribu selvática
 1952 - Los Kofán: una tribu de la alta Amazonia colombiana
 1944 - Comunidades indígenas del macizo colombiano
 1944 - El indio en lucha por la tierra: historia de los resguardos del macizo central colombiano. Editorial Universidad del Cauca, Popayán, 2020
 1943 - Los indios del alto Magdalena (vida, luchas y exterminio) 1609-1931

Conquest 
 1991 - Cristobal Colón y el encuentro de dos mundos
 1979 - El Adelantado don Gonzalo Jiménez de Quesada
 1974 - Biografía de Nicolás Federman, conquistador de Venezuela, 1506?-1542
 1970 - Rutas de Cartagena de Indias a Buenos Aires y sublevaciones de Pizarro, Castilla y Hernández Girón, 1540-1570
 1966 - Invasión del país de los chibchas, conquista del Nuevo Reino de Granada y fundación de Santafé de Bogotá: revaluaciones y rectificaciones
 1965 - Historia extensa de Colombia. 2, Descubrimiento y conquista del nuevo reino de Granada: introducción
 1965 - La extraordinaria experiencia de Francisco Martín (1531-1533)
 1963 - Vasco Núñez de Balboa y el descubrimiento del oceano pacifico
 1961 - Los Welser en la conquista de Venezuela
 1960 - Gonzalo Jiménez de Quesada a través de documentos históricos; estudio biográfico
 1960 - Vida y viajes de Nicolás Féderman, conquistador, poblador y cofundador de Bogotá, 1506-1542
 1959 - El 450 aniversario del nacimiento de Gonzalo Giménez de Quesada
 1959 - Geographical ideas and the conquest of Venezuela
 1957 - Sebastián de Benalcázar en el descubrimiento del Nuevo Reino de Granada
 1952 - Algunas observaciones sobre la realidad de la emigración española a América en la primera mitad del siglo XVI
 1950 - Antecedentes histórico-geográficos del descubrimiento de la meseta Chibcha por el licenciado Jiménez de Quesada

General history 
 1974 - La Batalla de Ayacucho, 9 de diciembre de 1824
 1971 - Bartolomé de las Casas in history: toward an understanding of the man and his work - with Benjamin Keen
 1968 - La batalla de Boyacá, 7 de agosto de 1819, a través de los archivos españoles. Recopilación documental, transcrita y anotada
 1964 - Fray Pedro Aguado y Fray Antonio Medrano, historiadores de Colombia y Venezuela
 1963 - Acerca del nombre del Perú
 1963 - Documentos sobre la fundación de la Casa de Moneda en Santa Fe de Bogotá (1614-1635) conservados en el Archivo General de Indias, Sevilla
 1963 - Historia de Pereira
 1961 - Vida y luchas de don Juan del Valle, primer obispo de Popayán y protector de indios; estudio documental basado en investigaciones realizadas en los archivos de Colombia, España y el Vaticano
 1959 - La censura española del siglo XVI y los libros de Historia de América
 1957 - Los franciscanos y el clero en el nuevo reino de Granada durante el siglo XVI
 1945 - El pintor colombiano The Colombian painter, Carlos Correa

Articles 
 1963 - Colones alemanes en la Sierra Nevada de Santa Marta
 1961 - El primer libro colombiano
 1961 - La introduccion de mineros alemanes en America por la compañia Welser de Augsburgo
 1960 - Quién fué el autor del "Epítome de la conquista del Nuevo Reino de Granada"?
 1957 - Los franciscanos y el clero en el nuevo reino de Granada durante el siglo XVI
 1956 - Nicolás Féderman en el descubrimiento del Nuevo Reino de Granada
 1955 - La rebelión de Álvaro de Oyón
 1952 - Las minas de Muzo y la "Peste" acaecida a principios del Siglo XVII en el Nuevo Reino de Granada
 1951 - Book Review: Los Muiscas antes de la Conquista
 1947 - El arte de los Kofán

Trivia 
 Juan Friede is featured on a Colombian postage stamp of 1997
 The wooden house where Friede lived in San Agustín was turned into the Casa Museo Juan Friede ("Juan Friede Museum") in 2006

See also 

List of Muisca and pre-Muisca scholars
Muisca
San Agustín
San Agustín Archaeological Park

References

Cited works by Juan Friede

Biography of Juan Friede

Other bibliography

External links 
  Los indios y la Historia by Juan Friede
  El arte de los Kofán by Juan Friede

1901 births
1990 deaths
Colombian people of Ukrainian-Jewish descent
Colombian Jews
Colombian anthropologists
Colombian archaeologists
20th-century Colombian businesspeople
20th-century Colombian historians
Muisca scholars
Academic staff of the National University of Colombia
Vienna University of Economics and Business alumni
Alumni of the London School of Economics
20th-century archaeologists
20th-century anthropologists
Soviet emigrants to Colombia